Truan is a Spanish surname. Notable people with the surname include:

 Carlos F. Truan (1935–2012), American businessman
 Enrique Truan (1905–1995), Spanish composer

Spanish-language surnames